Ybyrapora sooretama is a species of spider in the family Theraphosidae, found in Brazil.

Taxonomy
This species was described by Rogério Bertani and Caroline Sayuri Fukushima in 2009 as Avicularia sooretama. However, it was subsequently transferred into the genus Ybyrapora, making its currently accepted name Y. sooretama.

References

External links
 
 

Theraphosidae
Spiders of Brazil
Spiders described in 2009